Allandale is a former railway station in the Maitland local government area. It is on the NSW TrainLink Intercity network, on the Main North Line branch of the Hunter Line. It was temporarily closed in 2002 due to the nearby bridge construction, and permanently closed on 9 September 2005, after railway works by the Australian Rail Track Corporation. There is no sign of the station now.

Regional railway stations in New South Wales
Maitland, New South Wales
Railway stations in the Hunter Region
Railway stations in Australia opened in 1869
Railway stations closed in 2005
Main North railway line, New South Wales